Keats Island may refer to:

 Keats Island (British Columbia), Canada
 Keats Island (Newfoundland and Labrador), Canada